is the western tip of Yonaguni Island and the westernmost point in Japan. The cape is within the town of Yonaguni, Okinawa.

There is a lighthouse, an observation platform, and a monument titled  on the cape. Tourists gather at the cape daily to see the final sunset in Japan.

Geography

Kubara hill [] and its homonymous fishing port and settlement are visible to the east of the cape. The Black Current flows west of Cape Irizaki to the north, and is a rich fishing ground for marlin and skipjack tuna.

Cape Irizaki, like much of the Yaeyama Islands, is composed of sandstone and mudstone. The cape is devoid of trees due to constant strong winds. Unlike other areas of the Yaeyama Islands, Cape Irizaki is surrounded by very little coral reef.

History

Cape Irizaki is first mentioned in Shōhō Kuniezu, a kuniezu, or series of Japanese provincial land maps created during the Edo period (1603 – 1868). The Shōhō Kuniezu, which was compiled beginning in 1644, lists the cape as "Ire no Zaki". The cape became the westernmost point of Japan in 1879, when Japan annexed the Ryukyu Kingdom.

Transportation

Cape Irizaki is open to the public, and is easily accessible on foot from the settlement of Kubaradake. The cape is approximately one hour by car from Yonaguni Airport.

References

See also
 Extreme points of Japan

Extreme points of Japan
Landforms of Okinawa Prefecture
Tourist attractions in Okinawa Prefecture
Inzaki
Yonaguni, Okinawa